Cetate ("citadel") may refer to several places in Romania:

 Cetate, Bistrița-Năsăud, a commune in Bistriţa-Năsăud County
 Cetate, Dolj, a commune in Dolj County, the location of the Battle of Cetate
 Cetate, a village in Cetate, Dolj
 Cetate Stadium AKA Stadionul Cetate (Alba Iulia), a stadium in Alba Iulia
 Cetate Deva AKA CNS Cetate Deva, a Romanian professional football club from Deva, Hunedoara County which plays in the above stadium
 Cetate, Timișoara, a district in Timișoara, Timiș County
 Cetate Synagogue, a Jewish place of worship in Cetate, Timișoara

Other 
 Battle of Cetate, fought during the Crimean War

See also 
 Cetatea (disambiguation)
 Cetățuia (disambiguation)
 Pârâul Cetății (disambiguation)